The 2022 Archery European Indoor Championships took place in Laško, Slovenia from 14 to 19 February 2022. At the European Archery Indoor Championships was debuted the barebow discipline. Events staged in each of the three disciplines in the senior and under-21 age brackets.

Medals table

Medalists

Senior

Under 21

References 

European Indoor Championships
Archery European Indoor Championships
European Archery Championships
International sports competitions hosted by Slovenia
Archery European Indoor Championships